The Pathobiology of Early Arthritis Cohort (PEAC) is a consortium of independent, national centres of excellence with the specific purpose to create an extensively phenotyped cohort of patients with early inflammatory arthritis with linked, detailed pathobiological data.

Participating Centres
 Queen Mary, University of London
 University of Glasgow
 University of Birmingham
 Imperial College London
 King's College London
 University of Manitoba
 University College Dublin
 Hemel Hempstead General Hospital
 Università degli Studi di Pavia
 The University of Manchester
 Ospedale Niguarda Ca' Granda
 University of Oxford

References

External links
 PEAC official web site
 MRC official web site

Arthritis